Jorge Gattini (born 10 December 1964) is a Paraguayan agronomist and politician.

Gattini studied agronomics at the National University of Asunción. Afterwards he obtained a M.Sc. in Agricultural Economics at the Kansas State University and a Master in Applied Environmental Economy at the Imperial College London. He is a consultant in agricultural matters.

On 15 August 2013 he was sworn in as the Minister of Agriculture of Paraguay in the cabinet of President Horacio Cartes.

References

1964 births
Living people
Paraguayan people of Italian descent
Agriculture ministers of Paraguay
Paraguayan agronomists
Universidad Nacional de Asunción alumni
University of Kansas alumni
Alumni of Imperial College London